Heo Seonmi (born ) was a South Korean female artistic gymnast and part of the national team.

She participated at the 2015 World Artistic Gymnastics Championships in Glasgow.

References

External links
https://thegymter.net/heo-seon-mi/
Heo Seon Mi at Sports Reference
http://www.flogymnastics.com/video/566789-olympic-qualifications-london-2012-heo-seon-mi-kor-fx#.WKSXX1XyvIU

1995 births
Living people
South Korean female artistic gymnasts
Place of birth missing (living people)
Gymnasts at the 2012 Summer Olympics
Olympic gymnasts of South Korea
Universiade medalists in gymnastics
Universiade bronze medalists for South Korea
Medalists at the 2015 Summer Universiade
21st-century South Korean women